The Chinese government has censored the display of blood in various industries, particularly in the film, television, video game and anime industries.

Anime 
The Chinese government has repeatedly censored animes that the country considers immoral, especially animes that include bloody and violent scenes. Blood-C, a Japanese anime television series, has been banned since it includes a "particularly bloody" scene which may cause "extreme discomfort". In 2021, China announced to ban violent, vulgar, and bloody children's TV shows. A statement released by the National Radio and Television Administration said that "the content of broadcasts should be healthy and progressive and should promote truth, good, and beauty in cartoons".

Film 
The battle part of first episode of the eighth season of Game of Thrones is cut in China.

Video game 
The display of blood in Chinese game industry is strictly limited, if not banned. Before 2019, blood in many games cannot be red. And in 2019, a new ban prohibits even the presence of any blood. Peacekeeper Elite, a battle royale game developed in China, has no blood or death. When players get eliminated, they wave goodbye to the player who eliminated them.

References 

Blood
Censorship in China